The Goldene Aue (German: "golden lowland", also " ... bottom" or " ... meadow" / " ... pasture", with "Au[e]" referring to a low-lying area, often a wetland) is a valley in eastern Germany, in the states Thuringia and Saxony-Anhalt. It is situated between the towns Nordhausen in the west, and Sangerhausen in the east. It is bordered by the mountain ranges Harz in the north, and Windleite and Kyffhäuser in the south. The river Helme flows through the Goldene Aue.

Goldene Aue is also the name of two Verwaltungsgemeinschaften ("collective municipalities") in the valley:
Goldene Aue, Saxony-Anhalt
Goldene Aue, Thuringia

Regions of Thuringia
Nordhausen, Thuringia